A concatemer is a long continuous DNA molecule that contains multiple copies of the same DNA sequence linked in series. These polymeric molecules are usually copies of an entire genome linked end to end and separated by cos sites (a protein binding nucleotide sequence that occurs once in each copy of the genome). Concatemers are frequently the result of rolling circle replication, and may be seen in the late stage of bacterial infection by phages. As an example, if the genes in the phage DNA are arranged ABC, then in a concatemer the genes would be ABCABCABCABC and so on (assuming synthesis was initiated between genes C and A). They are further broken by ribozymes.

During active infection, some species of viruses have been shown to replicate their genetic material via the formation of concatemers. In the case of human herpesvirus-6, its entire genome is made over and over on a single strand. These long concatemers are subsequently cleaved between the pac-1 and pac-2 regions by ribozymes when the genome is packaged into individual virions.

Bacteriophage T4 replicating DNA was labeled with tritiated thymidine and examined by autoradiography.  The observed DNA replication intermediates included circular and branched circular concatemeric structures that likely arose by rolling circle replication.

When assembling concatemers from synthetic oligonucleotides, increasing salt concentration to 200 mM was found to be a major optimizing factor due to its ability to enhance ionic strength, which hastened the formation of concatemers.

References

Bibliography
 Oxford Dictionary of Biochemistry and Molecular Biology, 2nd ed. R. l., eds. Oxford University Press, 2006. p. 138.

Repetitive DNA sequences